Drakhtik is a village in the Shoghakat Municipality of the Gegharkunik Province of Armenia.

Etymology 
The village was previously known as Tokhluja. The current name of the village, Drakhtik, means "little paradise" in Armenian.

History 
Drakhtik, then known as Tokhluja, was part of the Nor Bayazet uezd of the Erivan Governorate within the Russian Empire. Bournoutian presents the statistics of the village in the early 20th century as follows:

Economy 
The population is engaged in animal husbandry, vegetable growing and grain cultivation.

Demographics 
The population of Drakhtik since 1829 is as follows:

Gallery

References

External links 
 
 

Populated places in Gegharkunik Province
Former Azerbaijani inhabited settlements